Kesslers International is the oldest British point-of-purchase designer and manufacturer, based in London, UK. The offices and the plant are currently situated in Stratford, East London.

History 
In 1888, Viennese wood-worker Bernhard Kessler opened a workshop that succeeded to the point that he expanded to London in 1928, opening Bernhard Kessler & Sons to be managed by his son Leopold. Leopold Kessler worked with a local firm on developing and manufacturing mine detectors. After World War II, Kesslers was commissioned by Parker Pen Company and Dunlop Tyres to begin producing retail display stands. This became a dominant business focus for them. In the mid 1970s, they took the name Kesslers International.

Current 
Nowadays, the company provides bespoke point-of-sale retail equipment, including design, technical engineering, manufacturing, installation and post-campaign customer service. Kesslers International Group is still a family-run business with William Kessler, Bernhard's grandson, being the Group's Chairman, and his sons, Charles and George, overseeing Kesslers International in its London headquarters.

Kesslers International is a member of POPAI (Point-of-Purchase Advertising International), and in 2010 won the group's bronze award for bespoke multimedia displays provided to Take One Media.

References

External links 
http://www.kesslers.com/
http://www.popai.co.uk/
https://web.archive.org/web/20111003101915/http://www.deborahjaffe.net/histories.html

Retail point of sale systems
Companies based in the London Borough of Newham